The Swiss Civil Code (SR/RS 210, ; ;) is a portion of the second part (SR/RS 2) of the internal Swiss law ("Private law - Administration of civil justice - Enforcement") that regulates the codified law ruling in Switzerland and relationship between individuals. It was first adopted in 1907 (effective since 1 January 1912).

It was largely influenced by the German civil code, and partly influenced by the French civil code, but the majority of comparative law scholars (such as K. Zweigert and Rodolfo Sacco) argue that the Swiss code derives from a distinct paradigm of civil law.

History and influences 
Adopted on 10 December 1907 (and is thus formally known as the Swiss Civil Code of 10 December 1907), and in force since 1912. It was created by Eugen Huber, it was subsequently translated in the two other national languages (at the time Romansh was not official) by Virgile Rossel and Brenno Bertoni for French and Italian, respectively.

The Civil code of the Republic of Turkey is a slightly modified version of the Swiss code, adopted in 1926 during Mustafa Kemal Atatürk's presidency as part of the government's progressive reforms and secularization. It also influenced the codes of several other states, such as Peru.

In 1911, the Swiss Code of Obligations (SR 22) was adopted and considered as the fifth part of the Swiss Civil Code. It thus became the first civil code to include commercial law.

Content 

The Swiss Civil Code contains more than two thousands articles. Its first article states that:

See also 
Swiss law
Swiss Code of Obligations
Swiss Criminal Code

References

External links 
  Bernhard Schnyder, "Code civil (CC)" in Dictionnaire historique de la Suisse, 02/08/2005.;
 English semi-official translation:
Parts 1–4 (Swiss Civil Code: persons, family, succession, property)
Part 5 (Code of Obligations)

Law of Switzerland
Civil codes